The Saybrook Colony was an English colony established in New England in late 1635 at the mouth of the Connecticut River in present-day Old Saybrook, Connecticut. Saybrook was founded by John Winthrop, the Younger, son of John Winthrop, the Governor of the Massachusetts Bay Colony. Winthrop the Younger was designated Governor by the original settlers, including Colonel George Fenwick and Captain Lion Gardiner. They claimed possession of the land via a deed of conveyance from Robert Rich, 2nd Earl of Warwick. The colony was named in honor of Lords Saye and Brooke, prominent Parliamentarians and holders of the colony's land grants.

History
Early settlers of the colony were ardent supporters of Oliver Cromwell and of democracy. In the 1630s in what became Connecticut, it was rumored that Cromwell's emigration was imminent from England to Saybrook, along with the departure from Old England of other prominent Puritan sponsors of the colony, including John Pym, John Hampden, Arthur Haselrig, and Lords Saye and Brooke. Even as late as the 1770s, residents of Old Saybrook still talked about which town lots would be given to prominent Parliamentarians.

Settlement preparations included sending a ship with an unusual cargo of ironwork for a portcullis and drawbridges, and even an experienced military engineer.[2] Saybrook's fort was to be the strongest in New England. However, prominent Puritans soon "found the countrie [England] full of reports of their going" and were worried that they would not be allowed to sell their estates and take ship. By 1638, the plans for Saybrook were abandoned. Cromwell's financial difficulties had been cleared up by an inheritance and he moved from Huntingdon to nearby Ely. Thus, the sponsors remained in England and played their respective political and military roles in the English Civil War and its aftermath. As a consequence, the colony struggled and, by 1644, Fenwick agreed to merge the colony with the more vibrant Connecticut Colony a few miles up river.

In 1647, Major John Mason assumed command of Saybrook Fort, which controlled the main trade and supply route to the upper river valley. The fort mysteriously burned to the ground, but another improved fort was quickly built nearby. He spent the next twelve years there and served as Commissioner of the United Colonies, its chief military officer, Magistrate, and peacekeeper. He was continually called upon to fairly negotiate the purchase of Indian lands, write a treaty, or arbitrate some Indian quarrel, many of which were instigated by his friend Uncas.

Role of slavery

Slaves in the colony were predominantly descendants of Africans from the Caribbean or were Native American prisoners from the Pequot War and worked in all major industries in the Triangle Trade including agriculture, shipbuilding, and rope making.For most of the 1600s, the slave population in Connecticut remained small and has been estimated at a few dozen. Gov. William Leete noted in 1679 that “as for blacks, there comes sometimes three or four in a year from Barbadoes.”
Slave labor was not as widespread or as profitable in New England as it was in the South. As a result, it was more common for white owners to have fewer slaves and in many instances, slaves were trained by their masters for trades or work on the farm.

See also
Lower Connecticut River Valley – Connecticut planning region covering the area

References

Further reading

External links
History of Old Saybrook at the Old Saybrook Historical Society

States and territories disestablished in 1644
English colonization of the Americas
Connecticut Colony
Middlesex County, Connecticut
History of the Thirteen Colonies
Former English colonies
States and territories established in 1635
Colonial settlements in North America
1635 establishments in the Thirteen Colonies